Elena Bozán (9 November 1916, Buenos Aires- 1963, Buenos Aires, Argentina), was an Argentine actress, dancer and vedette. She was the sister of the actresses Sofia Bozan and Haydée Bozán, and the cousin of Olinda Bozán.

Filmography 
 1928: La borrachera del tango
 1931: Las luces de Buenos Aires
 1936: El conventillo de la Paloma
 1938: La estancia del gaucho Cruz

References

External links

Argentine film actresses
Argentine female dancers
Argentine vedettes
1916 births
1963 deaths
20th-century Argentine people
20th-century Argentine actresses